The Karaagach is a small river in south-eastern Bulgaria which flows to the south of the town of Kiten on the territory of the Tsarevo Municipality. The river is rich in rare fish species and has varied flora.

Rivers of Bulgaria
Landforms of Burgas Province
Strandzha
Tributaries of the Black Sea